Mashel Teitelbaum (1921–1985) (variant name Mashel Alexander Teitelbaum) was a Canadian painter, born in Saskatoon, Saskatchewan in 1921. He was the father of museum director Matthew Teitelbaum.

Career
At first, self-taught but studied from 1950-1951 at the California School of Fine Arts with Clyfford Still and at Mills College with Max Beckmann (1951). He then lived in Montreal, then Toronto, where he worked as a set designer for CBC Television and served as art critic for the Toronto Telegram for over a decade (1954-1959). He then studied art in Europe (1959), and taught at the School of Fine Arts at the University of Manitoba (1960) before returning to Toronto, founding the New School of Art in 1962.

Art Work
At first, Teitelbaum  painted his own form of portraits featuring expressionism, then landscapes of various regions in Canada. His style became increasingly abstract throughout his years of painting, going through many changes, among them single Zen-like improvised gestures on unprimed canvas. By 1967, he critiqued modern art, then in 1973, he made paint skin constructions, of acrylic paint peeled away when dry from polyethylene sheets to make collages. He then turned to painting exuberant landscapes.

Selected exhibitions
 2004: MacLaren Art Centre, Barrie, Ontario: Abstract Innovations: Mashel Teitelbaum
 1991: Mendel Art Gallery, Saskatoon, From Regionalism to Abstraction: Mashel Teitelbaum and Saskatchewan Art in the 1940s 
 1946: Saskatoon Art Centre, Saskatoon (with William Perehudoff)

Selected collections
 Art Gallery of Ontario, Toronto
 Art Gallery of Peterborough
 Leonard and Bina Ellen Art Gallery, Concordia University, Montreal
 National Gallery of Canada, Ottawa
 MacKenzie Art Gallery, Regina
 Mendel Art Gallery, Saskatoon
 Robert McLaughlin Gallery, Oshawa
 Vancouver Art Gallery

He taught at the University of Manitoba School of Fine Art (1960), and New School, Toronto (1961). Mashel Teitelbaum died in Toronto, Ontario in 1985.

Personal life
Mashel Teitelbaum was described as a "brilliant but mercurial" artist, afflicted by bipolar disorder by the Toronto Star in 2009.

References

Additional sources 
 Fulford, Robert. Revolutions of the Soul: Mashel Teitelbaum in Canadian Painting
 Fulford, Robert & Donald Kuspit. Mashel Teitelbaum: A Retrospective. Hamilton: Art Gallery of Hamilton, 1992.
 Teitelbaum, Matthew et al. From Regionalism to Abstraction: Mashel Teitelbaum & Saskatchewan Art in the 1940s. 1991.

External links 
 National Gallery of Canada (Mashel Teitelbaum)

1921 births
1985 deaths
20th-century Canadian painters
Canadian male painters
Jewish Canadian artists
Jewish painters
Artists from Saskatoon
Canadian abstract artists
20th-century Canadian male artists
Canadian collage artists
20th-century Canadian Jews